James Christopher Read (born July 31, 1953) is an American actor.  He played the role of George Hazard in the North and South television miniseries, and had a recurring role as Victor Bennett on the supernatural series Charmed between 2001 and 2006.

Early life
Read was born in Buffalo, New York.  He studied acting in New York City and then did several Off-Broadway and regional theaters such as The Denver Center Theatre Company, where he had a couple of leading roles and spent three seasons. In 1998, he earned his Master's degree in psychology from Pepperdine University.

Career
Read is best known for his role as George Hazard in the three North and South miniseries (1985, 1986 and 1994) based on the John Jakes trilogy of novels of the same name (his co-star, Patrick Swayze, taught him how to ride a horse), and for his co-starring role in the movie Beaches (1988).

He had a recurring role on The WB series Charmed as Victor Bennett and was also a regular during the first season of Remington Steele. Recently, he could be seen as Ken Davis on the ABC family drama Wildfire and as ambassador Franklin Fairchild on the 2010 television series Persons Unknown. In 2008, he directed an episode of "Wildfire". In 2009, he performed in Better Angels as Abraham Lincoln at the Colony Theatre in Burbank, California. Since 2014, he has played the role of drug lord Clyde Weston on the soap opera Days of Our Lives. On May 30, 2018, Michael Fairman TV and Soap Opera Digest announced Read joined the ABC Daytime soap opera General Hospital on June 6, 2018, as Gregory Chase.

Personal life 
Read married Lora Lee in June 1978, and their marriage ended in divorce in 1983. He then married former actress/attorney Wendy Kilbourne in 1988, and the couple has three children: a son, Jackson (b. 1990), and two daughters Willa (b. 1994; stillborn) and Sydney (b. 1995). The family resides in Santa Barbara, California.

Filmography

Film

Television

Theater

References

External links
 

1953 births
Living people
American male film actors
American male television actors
American male stage actors
Male actors from Buffalo, New York
Male actors from Santa Barbara, California
University of Oregon alumni
Pepperdine University alumni